Conus pseudimperialis is a species of sea snail, a marine gastropod mollusk in the family Conidae, the cone snails and their allies.

Like all species within the genus Conus, these snails are predatory and venomous. They are capable of "stinging" humans, therefore live ones should be handled carefully or not at all.

Description
The size of the shell attains 37 mm.

Distribution
This marine species is endemic to the Marquesas.

References

 Moolenbeek R.G., Zandbergen A. & Bouchet P. (2008) Conus (Gastropoda, Conidae) from the Marquesas Archipelago: description of a new endemic offshore fauna. Vita Malacologica 6: 19–34.
 Puillandre N., Duda T.F., Meyer C., Olivera B.M. & Bouchet P. (2015). One, four or 100 genera? A new classification of the cone snails. Journal of Molluscan Studies. 81: 1–23

External links
 The Conus Biodiversity website
 
 Cone Shells – Knights of the Sea
 Holotype in MNHN, Paris

pseudimperialis
Gastropods described in 2008